Clarence Allen may refer to:

Clarence Ray Allen (1930–2006), American prison inmate who was executed by lethal injection
Clarence Emir Allen (1852–1932), U.S. Representative from Utah
Clarence Allen (geologist) (1925–2021), American geologist, member of the National Academy of Sciences

See also
Allen (surname)